Tenterden Town railway station is a heritage railway station on the Kent and East Sussex Railway in Tenterden, Kent, England.

When the railway line first opened in 1900, Rolvenden Station was known as "Tenterden". Its name was changed when the line extended north three years later and a station closer to Tenterden was constructed. The new Tenterden Town station opened on 16 March 1903. The line closed for regular passenger services on 4 January 1954 and all traffic in 1961. It reopened on 3 February 1974 under the aegis of the Tenterden Railway Company which bought the line between Tenterden and Bodiam. The station now houses the KESR's Carriage and Wagon works, and the Colonel Stephens Museum is located nearby.

Services

References 

Heritage railway stations in Kent
Former Kent and East Sussex Railway stations
Railway stations in Great Britain opened in 1903
Railway stations in Great Britain closed in 1954
Railway stations in Great Britain opened in 1974
Tenterden